The Iowa Masonic Library and Museum, located at 813 First Ave. SE, in Cedar Rapids, Iowa, United States, is one of the largest Masonic libraries in the world and incorporates at least three museum collections. The library was the first, worldwide, to have its own building (constructed in 1884). Its current building (constructed in 1955) also houses the administrative offices for the Grand Lodge of Iowa, one of the governing bodies for Freemasonry in Iowa.

History
The Library had its genesis in the 1840s, with a resolution by the Grand Lodge allocating funds to the Grand Secretary to purchase books on the topic of Freemasonry. In its earliest years the Library was located at the residence of Theodore S. Parvin, the first Grand Librarian, who started it with 5 books purchased for $5. It moved with him from Muscatine to Iowa City, to Davenport, then back to Iowa City where it was maintained until its final transfer to a more permanent home in Cedar Rapids in 1884. It has remained in Cedar Rapids ever since. The Masonic Library is now "reputed to be the largest [Masonic library] in the world, and is at least one of the top five, with over 100,000 volumes. Both Masonic and general books are included in the collections and the library is open to anyone, whether Masons or not."

The extensiveness and public access of the Masonic library are considered valuable. For example, Professor David Hackett of the University of Florida notes that "a fairly large...public collection of Prince Hall materials can be found at the Iowa Masonic Library in Cedar Rapids, Iowa." Likewise, Stephen Kantrowitz of the University of Wisconsin-Madison historian notes "Substantial collections of published black Masonic proceedings (which appear in significant numbers only from the 1870s on), pamphlets, and other publications are available at Masonic libraries, including the National Heritage Museum (Lexington, Mass.), the Livingston Library (New York, N.Y.), and the Iowa Masonic Library (Cedar Falls)."
 
The library was the location in 2008 of the Masonic Library and Museum Association (MLMA) annual meeting, 80 years after a similar meeting in Cedar Rapids at the original Masonic Library.

Museum
The Library includes three museum collections and is open to the public. The museum collections are extensive and include a Masonic collection on the first floor and a Non-Masonic collection on the 2nd floor, consisting of thousands of items. Also, there is the Charles H. Swab Memorial collection, donated by deed in 1958.

One of the more interesting artifacts is a Civil War flag, which served as standard for the Iowa regiment in the Battle of Champion Hill, where 97 Iowans were casualties.

In 2008, the Masonic Library became the temporary location of the African American Museum of Iowa, whose building at 55 12th Ave., SE, was flooded in the Iowa flood of 2008.

Buildings
In 1884 the Library became the first Masonic library in the world to have its own building.

The current building was built in 1955. It cost over a million dollars:
"The new building cost a little over $1,000,000. it is constructed of Vermont Marble, with grey marble from Carthage, Missouri, lining the interior halls. The metalwork in the windows, doors and stair rails is of bronze. The main portion of the building is over 245 feet long and 50 feet wide, while the library wing at the west end is 113 feet deep."

The front facade includes an inscription from the Bible (Amos 7:7): "Behold the Lord upon a wall made by a plumbline, with a plumbline in his hand."

The history of the fundraising and planning for the building is extensive.

It is a contributing building in the Grant Wood Cultural District, certified in 2010 by the Iowa State Historical Society.

Grand Lodge of Iowa
The Grand Lodge of Iowa, the governing body of Freemasonry within the state of Iowa, has its offices at the museum.

Founded in 1844, the Grand Lodge was actually in the Territory of Iowa at the time as Iowa did not gain statehood until two years later. Before the Grand Lodge of Iowa could be started, those that were interested within the Territory petitioned the Grand Lodge of Missouri for subordinate lodges. Scholars that are interested in Masonic history typically know of this Grand Lodge in particular because of the Iowa Masonic Library and Museum, which has a significant collection of Masonic and non-Masonic artifacts.

It is also noteworthy that the first four lodges operated under the Grand Lodge of Missouri before this Grand Lodge was able to be formed. The lineage for how all was founded is as follows as an excerpt from chapter III Genealogy of Iowa Masonry of the History of the Grand Lodge of Iowa (Page 49):

See also
National Czech & Slovak Museum & Library, a similar nearby cultural institution
National Heritage Museum (Lexington, Massachusetts), a similar Masonic library and museum
The Library and Museum of Freemasonry, Freemasons' Hall, London
Cedar Rapids Scottish Rite Temple a Masonic Temple in town on the National Register of Historic Places

References

External links
 Grand Lodge of Iowa: Library and Museum 
 Postcard
 Photograph of front of building

1955 establishments in Iowa
Library buildings completed in 1884
Masonic buildings completed in 1884
Library buildings completed in 1955
Masonic buildings completed in 1955
History museums in Iowa
Libraries in Iowa
Masonic buildings in Iowa
Buildings and structures in Cedar Rapids, Iowa
Museums in Cedar Rapids, Iowa
Masonic museums in the United States